Stellato (Italian: starry) is an Italian surname that may refer to:

 Deanna Stellato (born 1983), American figure skater
 Marcello Palingenio Stellato, 16th century Italian author
Sean P. Stellato (born 1977), American sports agent

See also

 Starry

Italian-language surnames